Stemmatophora byzacaenicalis is a species of snout moth in the genus Stemmatophora. It was described by Émile Louis Ragonot in 1887 and is known from Tunisia. It has also been recorded from Cyprus, but this might be a misidentification.

References

Moths described in 1887
Pyralini
Endemic fauna of Tunisia
Moths of Africa